Anastasia Viktorovna Tatalina (born 5 September 2000) is a Russian freestyle skier who competes internationally.
 
She competed in the World Championships 2017, and participated at the 2018 Winter Olympics. At the 2021 World Championships in Aspen, she scored more than 90 points in two consecutive jumps, and won gold in women's ski big air.

References

External links

2000 births
Living people
Russian female freestyle skiers
Sportspeople from Novosibirsk
Olympic freestyle skiers of Russia
Freestyle skiers at the 2018 Winter Olympics
Freestyle skiers at the 2022 Winter Olympics
Universiade silver medalists for Russia
Universiade medalists in freestyle skiing
Competitors at the 2019 Winter Universiade
21st-century Russian women